Byng Arts Mini School is a School District 39 Vancouver Mini School program and is located at Lord Byng Secondary School in West Point Grey in Vancouver, British Columbia. The Byng Arts Mini School, established in 1999, is for above average students whose energies and passions are dedicated to the Fine Arts. Successful applicants will be curious and self-motivated, with a demonstrated record of strong academic achievement.

As a school-within-a-school, Byng Arts, has all the benefits of a large high-school, while also maintaining a stong sense of community. Byng Arts students specialize in one of the following areas: Band, Choir, Drama, Media Arts, Strings, or Visual Arts (further opportunities are available in Literary Arts in Grade 11 and 12), and attend several of their academic classes (including English and Social Studies)together as a cohort of motivated learners.

In addition to an enriched curriculum, all students in Byng Arts participate in events that feature community artists, musicians and performers, thereby strengthening the collaboration between Byng and the professional arts community.

Program activities
Beyond the normal events hosted at Lord Byng, the arts mini school offers additionally exclusive events that are more broad arts geared.

"FAB" (Fine Arts At Byng) assemblies are guest performances held at the school by professionals in the Fine Arts community. Most of the time the guest performers are local artists but on occasion internationally traveling guests do appear. Originally known as "Fab Friday's" the performances were held after school once a month on Friday. However, in 2002 the consistent schedule of having them on Friday was replaced with a years calendar that could accommodate conflicting school events.

Also, the school hosts an annual gala. Showcases of student work are put on display and several performances are presented by the theatre arts and music students. The gala includes an award ceremony, full course dinner, dance, and chess tournament.

Byng Arts Passport

Each Byng Arts students receives a "Byng Arts Passport" designed to record events that celebrate the arts: visual, literary, musical, and dramatic. Mandatory Byng Arts events such as the "fab" assemblies are also recorded. A rewards system is implemented through this passport where students compete for year end awards and prizes. The Byng Arts Passport was an idea to encourage students to participate, see, and support the fine arts.

History
November 2006, Mandatory VSB online test registration begins.
2005-2006, Byng Art Mini School's Theatre Company gained international attention for staging the play The Laramie Project after the Surrey School Board banned the play.
September 2004, the Literary Arts program expanded to include Grades 8 to 12.
September 2003, a Literary Arts discipline was introduced at the Senior level. This program included: Literature 12, Enriched English 11, and English 12AP.
September 2000, the program officially becomes Byng Arts Mini School.
September 1999, a Junior program (Grade 8 - 10) is introduced.
Before September 1999, Byng Arts starts informally as a Senior program (Grade 11 and 12): Theatre Company, Honours Art, Concert Band, and Honour Orchestra.

Selection criteria
Students interested in the school undergo an extensive audition process. A Selection Committee begins by reviewing applications. Criteria such as previous arts experience and interest as well as the submitted cover letter, resume, and essay are overlooked. Those who pass the review stage are invited to audition at the school for their area of interest.

Students interested in Visual Arts are asked to submit five original as outlined by the pieces of work using the prompts provided by the Byng Art Department.  The work should demonstrate the applicant's skill with a variety of media and show who you are as an artist and as a person. 

Literary Arts applicants are requested to submit five pieces of writing including at least one analytical and one creative work.

Media Arts applicants are asked to submit a short film reel of their original film making work. It can be one piece or clips of two or more films. 

The Selection Process has three distinctive steps: Application Review, Short List, and Auditions.

Applications are reviewed and checked for:
Confirmation page from the VSB online application
Confirmation page from Byng Arts online application.
Completed cross boundary application form, if the catchment school is not Lord Byng.
Completed Byng Arts Mini School Reference Form.
Two most recent report cards: November and previous June.
A recent photograph.
Supporting documents for visual & literary arts applicants only.

Eligible students will be added to a Short List if successful through the Application Review. The short listed students are notified of appointment times for testing, auditions portfolio assessments, skills assessments, interviews as appropriate. Students selected for Byng Arts are offered positions, and students on wait list are notified of their wait-list status.

Application dates
Complete the District on-line application in early December.
Complete the Byng Arts on-line application also in early December,
Submit the completed application package before Winter Break. The package includes:
Confirmation of on-line application, both VSB and Byng Arts,
Byng Arts application form completed in the student's handwriting,
Byng Arts Mini School Reference Form in sealed envelope,
Two most recent report cards: November and previous June,
A recent photograph with the student's name written across the back.
 Write the District-wide standardized cognitive skills test, writing sample, and mathematics test at a specified test centre,
Visual arts applicants only are required to submit other supporting documents as requested in the application package.

References

Notes
Official Website Byng Arts Mini School
Mini School Information Vancouver School Board
Mini School Listings Vancouver School Board
The Laramie Project at Byng CBC News

External links
 Lord Byng Secondary School
 Vancouver School Board - Lord Byng
 Byng Arts Mini School
 Vancouver School Board - Byng Arts Mini School
 Byng Arts Student Council
 Lord Byng Community Music Society
 Lord Byng Band Department Website
 Lord Byng Symphony Orchestra

High schools in Vancouver
1999 establishments in British Columbia
Educational institutions established in 1999